The Open de Rennes is a tennis tournament held in Rennes, France since 2006. The event is part of the ''challenger series and is played on indoor hard courts.

Past finals

Singles

Doubles

External links 
 
ITF search

 
ATP Challenger Tour
Hard court tennis tournaments
Tennis tournaments in France
Sport in Rennes